Crown Dick is a 1987 drama film directed by Ossie Davis.

Synopsis
This drama presents the promise of the American dream as seen through the eyes of two different men. Dick Johnson, a bitter, unemployed black veteran, is visited by his Korean friend Kim, who has received a scholarship to study medicine in the U.S.

Cast
Don Reed - Dick Johnson 
Peter Yoshida - Kim
Ruby Dee - Johnson's Mother
Freda Foh Shon - Soon-Ja
Tim Williams - Clown
Torrence Hayes - Boy on Beach

Broadcast
The TV movie was broadcast as a segment of the PBS series Ossie & Ruby starring Ossie Davis and his wife Ruby Dee that ran from 1986 to 1987.

References

External links

1987 television films
1987 films
American drama films
1987 drama films
Films directed by Ossie Davis
Films about veterans
1980s English-language films
1980s American films